is a Japanese politician from the Liberal Democratic Party, who served as Chief Cabinet Secretary from 2008 to 2009, and a member of the House of Representatives from 1990 to 2021, representing the Yamaguchi 3rd district.

Political career
A native of Hagi, Yamaguchi and graduate of Keio University, he worked at Seibu Oil from 1967 to 1976. Kawamura then entered politics and served four terms in the Yamaguchi Prefecture assembly from 1976, followed by his election to the House of Representatives for the first time in 1990.

Kawamura served for a time as Minister of Education, Science and Technology under Prime Minister 
Junichiro Koizumi. In the Cabinet of Prime Minister Taro Aso, Kawamura was appointed as Chief Cabinet Secretary on September 24, 2008. He also served as Minister of State for Abduction issues in the Aso Cabinet, and as Chairman of the LDP's Election Strategy Committee.

Historical revisionism
Affiliated to the openly revisionist lobby Nippon Kaigi, Kawamura was part of the Committee on History and Screening formed in 1993 stating that Imperial forces only waged wars of liberation and self-defense, that the Nanking Massacre and the sexual slavery system known under the 'Comfort women' euphemism were fabrications, and that textbook revisions were needed.

References

External links 
 Official website  in Japanese.

1942 births
Living people
Members of Nippon Kaigi
Politicians from Yamaguchi Prefecture
Keio University alumni
Members of the House of Representatives (Japan)
Government ministers of Japan
Nanjing Massacre deniers
Education ministers of Japan
Liberal Democratic Party (Japan) politicians
21st-century Japanese politicians
Technology ministers of Japan
Science ministers of Japan